The Valley City Municipal Auditorium in Valley City, North Dakota was built in 1936.  It includes Modern Movement architecture, Stripped Classicism, and other architecture.  It was listed on the National Register of Historic Places in 2008.

It was deemed significant for its architecture but primarily for its historic role in the community.  The building has enabled the city to be host, since 1938, of the North Dakota Winter Show, and it has hosted many events.  One memorable event was Peggy Lee performing with the Dave Barbour Orchestra in shows during March 6–9, 1950.

References

Government buildings on the National Register of Historic Places in North Dakota
Government buildings completed in 1936
Auditoriums in the United States
National Register of Historic Places in Barnes County, North Dakota
Event venues on the National Register of Historic Places in North Dakota
Modern Movement architecture in the United States
1936 establishments in North Dakota
Stripped Classical architecture in the United States